Stephen A. Bean Municipal Airport  is a town owned, public use airport located two nautical miles (4 km) northwest of the central business district of Rangeley, a town in Franklin County, Maine, United States. It is included in the National Plan of Integrated Airport Systems for 2011–2015, which categorized it as a general aviation facility.

Facilities and aircraft 
Stephen A. Bean Municipal Airport covers an area of 125 acres (51 ha) at an elevation of 1,825 feet (556 m) above mean sea level. It has one runway designated 14/32 with an asphalt surface measuring 3,201 by 75 feet (976 x 23 m).

The airport is named after the late Stephen A. Bean, who ran a flight school, and taught seaplane flying in the town of Rangeley, Maine.  Steven died in a plane crash in December, 2000.

For the 12-month period ending August 16, 2010, the airport had 12,350 aircraft operations, an average of 33 per day: 97% general aviation, 2% military, and <1% air taxi. At that time there were 6 aircraft based at this airport: 100% single-engine.

Instrument Approach Procedures:
  (Area navigation / GPS)
  (Non-directional beacon)

See also 
 Rangeley Lake Seaplane Base at

References

External links 

 Aerial image as of June 1997 from USGS The National Map
 
 

Airports in Maine
Transportation buildings and structures in Franklin County, Maine